Potter Glacier is a glacier about 12 nautical miles (22 km) long, between Mount Huggins and Kempe in the Royal Society Range, flowing generally southwest into the Skelton Glacier. Mapped by United States Geological Survey (USGS) from ground surveys and Navy air photos. Named by Advisory Committee on Antarctic Names (US-ACAN) in 1963 for Lieutenant Commander Edgar A. Potter, U.S. Navy, helicopter pilot at McMurdo Station in 1960.

Glaciers of Victoria Land
Scott Coast